Zhang Zhidong (4 September 18375 October 1909) was a Chinese politician who lived during the late Qing dynasty. Along with Zeng Guofan, Li Hongzhang and Zuo Zongtang, Zhang Zhidong was one of the four most famous officials of the late Qing dynasty. Known for advocating controlled reform and modernization of Chinese troops, he served as the governor of Shanxi Province and viceroy of Huguang, Liangguang and Liangjiang, and also as a member of the Grand Council. He took a leading role in the abolition of the Imperial examination system in 1905. The Red Guards destroyed his tomb in 1966 during the Cultural Revolution. His remains were rediscovered in 2007 and reburied.

Other names
Zhang Zhidong was also known by other names. An older Wade–Giles form was Chang Chih-tung.  His courtesy name was Xiaoda or Xiangtao. His pseudonyms were Xiangyan, Hugong, Wujing Jushi and Baobing. The posthumous name given to him by the Qing government was Wenxiang.

Early life
Zhang was born in Xingyi Prefecture, Guizhou Province, but his ancestral roots were in Nanpi, Tianjin, Zhili Province. He was the cousin of Zhang Zhiwan. In 1852, he sat for the provincial-level imperial examination in Shuntian Prefecture (present-day Beijing) and achieved the top position as jieyuan in the juren class. In 1863, he sat for the palace-level examination and emerged as tanhua, the third highest-ranked candidate of the jinshi class. In 1882, he was transferred as the xunfu (provincial governor) of Shanxi Province. Empress Dowager Cixi promoted him to Viceroy of Huguang in August 1889.

During the Dungan Revolt of 1862–1877, the Russian Empire occupied the Ili region in Xinjiang. After Qing imperial forces successfully crushed the Dungan Revolt, they demanded that the Russians withdraw from Ili, which led to the Ili Crisis.

After the incompetent negotiator Chonghou, who was bribed by the Russians, without permission from the Qing government, signed a treaty granting Russia extraterritorial rights, consulates, control over trade, and an indemnity, a massive uproar by the Chinese literati ensued, some of them calling for Chonghou's death. Zhang demanded for Chonghou's execution and urged the Qing government to stand up to Russia and declare the treaty invalid. He said, "The Russians must be considered extremely covetous and truculent in making the demands and Chonghou extremely stupid and absurd in accepting them... If we insist on changing the treaty, there may not be trouble; if we do not, we are unworthy to be called a state." The Chinese literati demanded the Qing government mobilize their armed forces against the Russians. The Qing government allocated important posts to officers from the Xiang Army, while British military officer Charles George Gordon advised the Chinese.

First Sino-Japanese War
Zhang became involved in the First Sino-Japanese War, although not on the frontline. He initially advocated foreign aid from European forces near Tianjin in fighting the Japanese. In October 1894, he telegraphed Li Hongzhang, the Viceroy of Zhili, proposing the purchase of naval equipment, and loans from foreign banks. He further advocated this, and in addition the purchase of arms, alliance with European powers, and the "clear division of rewards and punishments" for troops, once the Japanese crossed the Yalu River into China in late October, threatening the northeastern provinces. In early 1895, the Japanese had begun an assault on Shandong, and Zhang telegraphed the governor Li Bingheng in an emergency that suggested fast civil recruitments, the building of strong forts, and the use of landmines, to prevent further Japanese advance. He had also sent arms and munitions to aid the campaign.

Taiwan
Zhang held on a strong opinion on the issue of ceding Taiwan to the Japanese, per the 1895 Treaty of Shimonoseki that ended the First Sino-Japanese War. In late February 1895, he made his stance clear to the Qing government, and even offered ideas on how to prevent the loss of Taiwan. He suggested that they take huge loans from the British, who would in turn send their navy to defend Taiwan from the Japanese. In addition, he proposed giving mining rights to the British on Taiwan for about 10 to 20 years. In May 1895, the Qing government ordered all civil and military officials to evacuate Taiwan. Zhang also refused to provide aid to the remaining Qing forces in Taiwan, especially after the fall of Keelung and with Taipei as the sole remaining Qing stronghold in Taiwan. On 19 October 1895, the last of the Qing forces in Taiwan, led by Liu Yongfu, withdrew to Xiamen.

Modernization of China's military
After China's defeat in the Sino-French War in 1885, Zhang was said to reflect on the events of the war and expressed his desire to establish a modern military to match up to that of the Western forces in a memorial to the throne. Upon Zhang's reflection, the weaknesses of traditional Chinese troops were identified in comparison with the Western troops, which had better firepower, mobility, and individual combat capability. When Zhang created the Guangdong Military Academy, also known as Guangdong Naval and Military Officers Academy, and the Guangdong Victorious Army, he set physical admission standards high and hired German officers as instructors to address the weaknesses of the Chinese troops. Specifically, in modernizing the troops in Guangdong, Zhang made newly trained troops to be "the nucleus" of newer troops, passing the training unit to unit. In addition, Zhang synthesized Chinese traditional learning and Western military learning in Guangdong Military Academy under his guiding principle of ti-yong(體用), which stresses Chinese traditional values and deems Western imports to be for practical uses only. He also established the Hubei Military Academy in 1896, where he employed instructors from the Guangdong Academy. The majority of the staff were Chinese. He also hired some German officers as instructors.

While serving as the governor of Nanjing in 1894, Zhang invited a German training regiment of 12 officers and 24 warrant officers to train the local garrison into a modern military force. In 1896, acting under an imperial decree, Zhang moved to Wuchang to serve as the Viceroy of Huguang, an area comprising Hubei and Hunan provinces. Zhang drew on his experience in Nanjing to modernize the military forces under his command in Huguang.

In Wuchang, Zhang effectively trained and equipped modern units of sappers, engineers, cavalry, police, artillery and infantry. Of the 60,000 men under his command, 20,000 men were directly trained by foreign officers, and a military academy was established in Wuchang in order to train future generations of soldiers. Zhang armed the troops with German Mauser rifles and other modern equipment. Foreign observers reported that, when their training was complete, the troops stationed in the Wuchang garrison were the equal of contemporary European forces.

During the Boxer Rebellion, Zhang, along with some other regional governors who commanded substantial modernized armies, refused to participate in the central government's declaration of war against the Eight-Nation Alliance. Zhang assured the foreigners during negotiations that he would do nothing to help the central government. He told this to Everard Fraser. This clique was known as The Mutual Protection of Southeast China.

Zhang's troops later became involved in politics. In 1911, the Wuchang garrison led the Wuchang Uprising, a coup against the local government that catalyzed the nationwide Xinhai Revolution. The Xinhai Revolution led to the collapse of the Qing dynasty and its replacement by the Republic of China.

Involvement in reform 
Zhang Zhidong's clique in the late Qing court was extremely influential with a strong reform tendency. Yang Rui, one of the Six Martyrs, was Zhang's political informant in Beijing who carried out Zhang's instructions during Hundred Days' Reform of 1898. Chen Baozhen is another subordinate who shared Zhang's academic visions, and Chen coauthored a memorial to the court with Zhang to suggest the reform of Civil Service Exam. Zhang had a strong grasp of the progress of reforms as he had more temporary confidants and informants from other regions.

In the third month of 1898, Zhang published his work Exhortation to Study (勸學篇), which addresses the questions of educational reform. He insisted on a method of relatively conservative reform, summarized in his phrase "Chinese Learning as Substance, Western Learning for Application" (中學為體，西學為用). In Exhortation to Study (勸學篇), Zhang brought up reform methodology of implementing new schools at the expense of Buddhist and Taoist monasteries. While doing so, reservation of 30 percent of  the monasteries and introduction of Confucianization were also part of the methodology to help the two religions subsist. Zhang Zhidong's reform on education is said not to eliminate religious institutions, but to better allocate resources.

Kang Youwei, another late Qing reformist, later expressed similar mode of thinking - he also advocated aiding modern education at the cost of temples. However, Kang Youwei is more radical as he envisions destruction of religions in comparison to Zhang's conservative approach. Zhang was supportive of Kang's vision of scholarly learning, but rejects Kang's proposal of Confucian religion. Historians commonly regard Zhang Zhidong's reform as an attempt to reconcile modernity and China's existing social fabric.

He succeeded Liu Kunyi as Viceroy of Liangjiang in 1901, and moved to Nanjing, where he laid the foundations for the modern University of Nanjing. Zhang Zhidong, along with Liu Kunyi and Wei Guangtao, were the founders of Sanjiang Normal College. Zhang espoused Japanese educational system and principles, and announced his plan to hire 12 Japanese teachers(教习) in a communication with Moriyoshi Nagaoka (長岡護美) before the establishment of the college.

Later life
In 1900, he advocated the suppression of the Boxer Rebellion. When the Eight-Nation Alliance entered Beijing, Zhang, along with Li Hongzhang and others, participated in The Mutual Protection of Southeast China. He quelled local revolts and defeated the rebel army of Tang Caichang. He was appointed the Minister of Military Affairs in 1906, and worked in Beijing for the central government.

He was aware that a change in Chinese affairs was necessary, and at the same time realized that the Chinese officials and people clung with unyielding tenacity to their traditional ideas and institutions and penned his ideas in a book: China's only hope: An Appeal. The book was distributed to the Grand Council of State, Viceroys, Governors and Literary Examiners of China.

Zhang Zhidong's sons were Zhang Yanqing and Zhang Renli.

Zhang died of illness in 1909 in Beijing at the age of 72. He was given the posthumous title Wen Xiang (文襄).

References

Citations

Sources 

 
 
 
 

 

|-

|-

|-

|-

|-

1837 births
1909 deaths
Assistant Grand Secretaries
Chinese people in rail transport
Chinese people of the Boxer Rebellion
Grand Councillors of the Qing dynasty
Grand Secretaries of the Qing dynasty
Governors of Shanxi
People of the Tonkin campaign
Politicians from Cangzhou
Political office-holders in Guangdong
Political office-holders in Hubei
Political office-holders in Jiangsu
Political office-holders in Shanxi
Qing dynasty politicians from Hebei
Viceroys of Huguang
Viceroys of Liangjiang
Viceroys of Liangguang